Extended Play is the fourth extended play (EP) by English electronic music band Ladytron, released in the United States on 11 April 2006 by Rykodisc. The two-disc compilation features exclusive unreleased remixes and the UK B-sides from "Sugar" and "Destroy Everything You Touch", as well as a 35-minute bonus DVD.

Track listing

CD
"High Rise" (Club Mix) – 6:09
"Nothing to Hide" – 3:51
"Weekend" (James Iha Mix) – 4:02
"Sugar" (Jagz Kooner Mix) – 5:25
"Citadel" – 3:54
"Destroy Everything You Touch" (Catholic Version) – 4:45
"Tender Talons" – 3:31
"Last One Standing" (Shipps & Tait Mix) – 3:47

DVD
"Destroy Everything You Touch"
"Sugar"
Once Upon a Time in the East: Ladytron in China
(Note: "USA vs. White Noise" is performed in its entirety at the end)

Charts

References

2006 EPs
Albums produced by Jim Abbiss
Ladytron albums
Rykodisc EPs